Ankilimary is a rural commune in Atsimo-Andrefana Region, Madagascar. It is situated in the district of Benenitra.

Geography
Ankilimary is situated at the Onilahy River.

References

Populated places in Atsimo-Andrefana